James D. Brubaker (March 30, 1937 – January 3, 2023) was an American film producer and production manager. Associated with Chartoff-Winkler Productions for several years, he had producing credits on several of the company's productions including two films in the Rocky series, as well as True Confessions and The Right Stuff. He later served as president of physical production at Universal Pictures from 2003 to 2008.

Biography
Brubaker was born in Los Angeles, to Margaret Hayes Brubaker and Dudley Sutton Brubaker. His family was of Swiss-German descent. He attended California State University, Los Angeles and served in the U.S. Army. He began working in the film industry as a driver, transporting horses to sets on Western films. For his work on Gia, he won the 1999 Directors Guild of America Award and was nominated for a 1998 Primetime Emmy Award.

Brubaker and his wife, Marcy Kelly, had three children. On January 3, 2023, he died at his home in Beverly Hills, California, from complications of multiple strokes.

Filmography
He was a producer in all films unless otherwise noted.

Film

Production manager

Transportation department

As an actor

Editorial department

Miscellaneous crew

Thanks

Television

Production manager

Transportation department

References

External links
 

1937 births
2023 deaths
Film producers from California
American film studio executives
California State University, Los Angeles alumni
United States Army soldiers
Military personnel from California
American people of Swiss-German descent
People from Hollywood, Los Angeles